Miracle in Bosnia (Bosnian: Čudo u Bosni) is a 1995 Bosnian documentary film directed by Dino Mustafić and Danis Tanović, written by Zlatko Topčić, produced by Edin Lonić and Smail Tokić.

It won the Special Award at the 1995 Cannes Film Festival.

Plot and theme

A documentary film shot on the occasion of the third anniversary of Army of the Republic of Bosnia and Herzegovina. Combining documentary materials with narrative, the film shows an evolution of the Bosnian Army, from small units, as it was at the beginning of the war, to military formations at the end of the third year of the war.

Production

The film was shot during the Bosnian War.

Release and screenings

During 1995 and 1996, it was screened at over 20 international film festivals: Cannes Film Festival, Venice Film Festival, Berlin International Film Festival, International Film Festival Rotterdam, Karlovy Vary International Film Festival, Toronto International Film Festival, Locarno Festival, New York Film Festival, Los Angeles Film Festival, International Documentary Film Festival Amsterdam, and many other.

Reception

Miracle in Bosnia garnered positive reviews by audiences and critics. It received a 15 minute standing ovation at the 1995 Cannes Film Festival. Film critics from The New York Times and Los Angeles Times praised the film.

See also
List of Bosnia and Herzegovina films

References

External links

1995 films
Bosnia and Herzegovina documentary films
Bosnian War films
1990s war films
1995 documentary films
Bosnian-language films
Documentary films about war
Films directed by Danis Tanović
Films directed by Dino Mustafić
Films set in Bosnia and Herzegovina
Films set in Sarajevo
Films with screenplays by Zlatko Topčić
Documentary films about the Bosnian War
Bosnia and Herzegovina war films